LS Cable & System (Korean: LS전선, 엘에스전선) is a South Korea-based industrial corporation with global operations and one of the biggest cable manufacturers worldwide. Its products comprise power and telecommunication cables and systems, as well as integrated modules and other related industrial materials. LS Cable & System furthermore provides engineering services, installation and commissioning of high voltage and extra high voltage landlines as well as turnkey submarine cabling project execution.
 
LS Cable & System (LS C&S) has its headquarters at the LS Tower in Anyang and nine domestic factories of which six are located in Gumi, two in Donghae and one in Anyang. Additionally LS C&S has nine other factories in China, Malaysia, Vietnam and India. Furthermore, LS C&S owns magnet wire and data cable manufacturer Superior Essex with 24 factories spread over North America, Europe and China. LS C&S sales  subsidiaries and branches overseas are located in Asia, the Middle East, Africa, Europe and in the Americas. LS C&S also owns JS Cable, Gaeon Cable, Pountek, Global Cable Incorporated, Kospace and Alutek, all of them with factories in Korea.

History 

LS Cable & System was founded as Korea Cable Industry in May 1962 and became Goldstar Cable in 1969.

It was then known as LG (LG = Lucky Goldstar) Cable until it separated from the LG Group in November 2003 to lead an independent brand power. It was established as its own cable company, LS Cable, in March 2005 as a part of the newly formed LS Group.

On June 11, 2008, LS Cable announced the purchase of Atlanta-based magnet wire and communication cable maker Superior Essex.  The transaction, valued at roughly $900 million, extends LS Cable's reach into North American and European markets.

In March 2011 LS Cable was renamed and thus became LS Cable & System.

Products

Energy cables & systems 

 LV, MV, HV & EHV power transmission & distribution cables & systems
 Submarine cables, accessories, systems, engineering, installation & commissioning
 Industrial & specialty cables & systems
 Overhead power lines
 Busduct  & accessories

Telecommunication cables, components and solutions 
 Optical fiber, optical fiber cable
 Components and apparatus
 LAN cable, radio frequency
 FTTH, system integration

Integrated modules & cables 
 Industrial cable & module
 Automotive wire & solutions
 Tube components
 HV connectors

Industrial materials 
 Copper wire rod
 Aluminum materials
 Rubber flooring tile

Magnet wire & copper data cables 
 Magnet wires
 Copper data cables

Branches

Africa 
 Egypt: Cairo
 South Africa: Johannesburg

America 
 Brazil: Sao Paulo
 Mexico: Mexico City
 Peru: Lima
 United States: Tarboro, NC

Asia 

 Bangladesh:  Dhaka
 India: Bangalore, Chennai, Hyderabad, Kolkata, Mumbai
 Indonesia: Jakarta
 Philippines: Manila
 Singapore: Singapore
 South Korea: Anyang, Busan, Daegu, Daejeon, Donghae, Gumi, Gwangju

Europe 
 Russia: Moscow

Middle East 
 United Arab Emirates: Abu Dhabi
 Saudi Arabia: Riyadh
 Islamic republic of Iran: Tehran

Oceania 
Australia: Sydney

Subsidiaries

Asia 
 China: LSHQ  (ownership: 75.1%) in Yichang, LSIC  (100%) in Peking, Shanghai, Guangzhou and Xi'an, LSCT  (87.5%) in Tianjin, LSCW (100%) in Wuxi
 India: LSCD  in New Delhi, LSCI  (100%) in Haryana
 Japan: LSCJ  (100%) in Tokyo
 Malaysia: LSCM  (100%) in Penang
 South Korea: JS Cable Co.  (69.9%), Global Cable Incorporated Co. (98.2%), Alutek Co. (100%), Pountek Co. (100%), Kospace Co. (99.2%)
 Myanmar: LS-Gaon Cable Myanmar (LSGM) in Yangon, LS-Gaon Cable Myanmar Trading (LSGMT) in Yangon
 Indonesia: LS-AG Cable Indonesia (LSAG) in Karawang, PT LSAG Cable Indonesia (LSAG) in Karawang

Europe 
 United Kingdom: LSCNSU (100%) in London

North America 
 United States: LS Cable America, Inc. (100%) in Fort Lee, NJ, and LS Cable & System USA (81%) in Atlanta, GA

Trade fairs 

In 2012 LS Cable & System participated for the first time in the company's history in the InnoTrans, a trade fair with focus on the rail transport industry, by exhibiting its railway related products.

Sponsoring activities 

LS Cable & System is sponsoring Seoul's 700 Yachting Club Racing Team. Thanks to the sponsoring the Yachting Club was able to upgrade one of its Yamaha 31 Festa yachts to enable it to participate in International Class and Offshore Racing Class (ORC) races. The LS C&S boat came third in the Korea Cup 2012 in the category "Leg 1" and ranked third in the BMW Cup as well.

Also, the Yachting Club participated in various additional races with the LS C&S yacht, such as the Yellow Sea International Yacht Race, the Han River International Yacht Race 2012 and the Subaru Za Cup Tokyo Bay Open 2012.

See also 
 Economy of South Korea
 LS Group
 LS Holdings home page

Official home pages 
 LS Cable & System home page
 Superior Essex home page
 LS-VINA Cable & System home page
 LS Mtron home page
 LS Cable & System home page (Korean)
 LS-Gaon Cable Myanmar home page

References 

Engineering companies of South Korea
Chemical companies of South Korea
Wire and cable manufacturers
Companies established in 2003
South Korean brands
Companies listed on the Korea Exchange